Bodybuilding was part of all World Games until 2009. In 2009 Fitness events were added. After violations of the Anti-Doping Rules at the 2009 games, the International World Games Association decided to suspend the sport from participating in the 2013 World Games and subsequent World Games.

Medalist

Bodybuilding

Men

- 65 kg

- 70 kg

- 75 kg

- 80 kg

- 85 kg

- 90 kg

+ 80 kg

+ 85 kg

+ 90 kg

Women

- 52 kg

- 55 kg

- 57 kg

+ 52 kg

+ 57 kg

Fitness

Women

Fitness Open

References

External links
MuscleMemory

 
Bodybuilding
World Games